John Anderson (born 16 December 1966) is a Canadian equestrian. He competed in the individual jumping event at the 1988 Summer Olympics.

References

External links
 

1966 births
Living people
Canadian male equestrians
Olympic equestrians of Canada
Equestrians at the 1988 Summer Olympics
Sportspeople from Calgary